Totally Country Vol. 4 is an album in the Totally Hits series.

Track listing
"That'd Be Alright" – Alan Jackson (3:39)
"Redneck Woman" – Gretchen Wilson (3:42)
"No Shoes, No Shirt, No Problems" – Kenny Chesney (3:31)
"Some Beach" – Blake Shelton (3:26)
"Save a Horse (Ride a Cowboy)" – Big & Rich (3:21)
"I Love This Bar" – Toby Keith (5:35)
"Brokenheartsville" – Joe Nichols (3:52)
"Little Moments" – Brad Paisley (3:41)
"Letters From Home" – John Michael Montgomery (4:28)
"Tough Little Boys" – Gary Allan (3:57)
"Desperately" – George Strait (4:07)
"Let's Be Us Again" – Lonestar (3:54)
"Perfect" – Sara Evans (4:03)
"Heaven" – Los Lonely Boys (3:49)
"I Can't Sleep" – Clay Walker (4:03)
"Help Pour Out the Rain (Lacey's Song)" – Buddy Jewell (3:49)
"Hell Yeah" – Montgomery Gentry (4:50)

Chart performance

Weekly charts

Year-end charts

Certifications

References

Totally Country
2005 compilation albums